Andrew Sabiston is a multi-award nominated Canadian children's television series developer, story editor, writer and actor with over 1100 episodes to his credit. His mother is artist Carole Sabiston.

Early career
An early start as a stage actor in his childhood with the Belfry Theatre, Bastion Theatre and Phoenix Theatre in his native Victoria, BC, led to being cast in Paul Almond's 1983 film Ups and Downs alongside classmate Leslie Hope which was filmed at their high school, St Michaels University School. He soon landed a starring role on the multiple award-winning Disney Channel/CBC television series The Edison Twins which ran for six seasons, was widely syndicated and earned him a Young Artist Award nomination for Best Young Actor in a Cable Family Series. Andrew Sabiston's first writing credit (Story Idea by) was for the Home Sweet Home episode of The Edison Twins, which aired in 1984.

Other film and television roles included starring in Paul Saltzman’s coming-of-age film When We First Met opposite Amy Linker in 1984, guest starring on MacGyver in 1987 (Hell Week; Season 3, Episode 9) alongside John Cameron Mitchell and appearing as a juror in the 1994 thriller Trial by Jury starring Gabriel Byrne, Armand Assante and Joanne Whalley.

Children's television series

Developer 
Many of the children's television series in which Andrew Sabiston has been involved are multiple award-nominees and/or winners airing internationally. As of 2019, series that he has created, developed or co-developed include: The Remarkable Mr. King (based on the Mr. King book series by author-illustrator Geneviève Côté, Kiki & Nuna, Super Wings (Seasons 3,4 and 5), Ranger Rob and The Moblees.

Writer 
Series with a writing credit include all of the above and Agent Binky: Pets of the Universe, Hatchimals, The Cat in the Hat Knows a Lot About That!, Max & Ruby, The Adventures of Napkin Man,  Dot., Trucktown, Justin Time, You & Me by Jason Hopley on CBC, The Travels of the Young Marco Polo, My Big Big Friend, Franklin and Friends, Monster Math Squad, Animal Mechanicals, Pirates: Adventures in Art, Bo on the Go!, Strawberry Shortcake’s Seaberry Beach Party, Turbo Dogs and Lunar Jim.

Voice 
Series that Andrew Sabiston has voiced leading characters and guest roles on include: Corn & Peg, Little Bear, Mike the Knight, Arthur, Bo on the Go!, Little Charmers, Donkey Kong Country, Go Away, Unicorn!, BeyWheelz, Polka Dot Shorts, The Amazing Spiez, Totally Spies!, Super Why!, Artopia, Toot & Puddle, Roboroach, Knights of the Zodiac, Rescue Heroes, Air Master, Tales From the Cryptkeeper, The Future Is Wild, What It’s Like Being Alone, Care Bears Movie: Journey to Joke-a-Lot, Bill & Ted’s Excellent Adventures, The Neverending Story, Star Wars: Droids, Super Mario World, Stickin' Around, Harry and His Bucket Full of Dinosaurs, Babar and the Adventures of Badou, and Wish Kid.

Theatre

For the theatre, Andrew Sabiston is the lyricist and co-book writer with composer Timothy Williams for the musical Napoleon which was first produced in 1994 at The Elgin Theatre in Toronto under the direction of John Wood. It was subsequently produced in 2000 at the Shaftesbury Theatre in London under the direction of Francesca Zambello.  In 2009, a new version was first presented in concert at Talk Is Free Theatre in Barrie, Ontario under the direction of Richard Ouzounian. This marked the beginning of a reimagining of the musical as an intimate, behind-the-scenes political drama with a cast half the size of the original productions and a new book and musical numbers. The new Napoleon debuted at the New York Musical Theatre Festival in July 2015.

In July 2017, a generous new production opened at the Charlotte Theatre in Seoul for a limited three-month run. It featured a cast of 54 including K-pop artists B.A.P's Daehyun and BtoB's Changsub alongside famous musical actors such as Im Tae-kyung, Michael K. Lee, and Han Ji-sang. It was directed by Richard Ouzounian and presented in Korean.

Awards & nominations

See also 
 List of Canadian voice actors
 List of musicals
 List of dragons in film and television

References

External links
 
 
 Canadian Musical Theatre Data Base - NAPOLEON: specs, videos, song samples and reviews

Living people
Canadian people of English descent
Canadian male television actors
Canadian male voice actors
Canadian musical theatre lyricists
Canadian television writers
Male actors from Victoria, British Columbia
Writers from Victoria, British Columbia
Canadian male television writers
Canadian songwriters
20th-century Canadian screenwriters
20th-century Canadian male writers
21st-century Canadian screenwriters
21st-century Canadian male writers
1965 births